Telly Hughes is an American television sports personality and Big Ten Network host.

Personal life
A native of Cahokia, Illinois, Hughes lives in Milwaukee with his family and is a graduate of Illinois State University where he pitched for the baseball team.

Career
He worked as a weekend sports anchor at WMAZ-TV in Macon, Georgia. He also worked for WHO and KPLR before working his way to Fox Sports North covering the Minnesota Twins, Timberwolves, and Wild for one year.

He previously worked for Fox Sports Wisconsin as a sideline reporter and host for Milwaukee Brewers and Bucks telecasts. He joined the network in 2009 after spending a few years in the Twin Cities working for Fox Sports North. Hughes currently provides studio coverage for the Big Ten Network.

References 

Living people
People from East St. Louis, Illinois
People from Minneapolis
Illinois State Redbirds baseball players
Illinois State University alumni
Minnesota Wild announcers
Minnesota Twins announcers
Minnesota Timberwolves announcers
Milwaukee Brewers announcers
Milwaukee Bucks announcers
American television sports anchors
College basketball announcers in the United States
National Basketball Association broadcasters
National Hockey League broadcasters
Major League Baseball broadcasters
People from Cahokia, Illinois
Year of birth missing (living people)